Ricky Sharpe (born January 23, 1980) played in the Arena Football League as a defensive back/wide receiver for the Los Angeles Avengers.

High school years
Sharpe attended Mt. Carmel High School in San Diego, California, where he was a standout in football, basketball, and track & field.

College career
Sharpe attended San Diego State University, where he was an All-Mountain West Conference second team selection as a sophomore and senior, and an All-Mountain West Conference honorable mention selection as a junior. He finished his career with 191 tackles, six interceptions, and three fumble recoveries.

After football
Sharpe is a contestant on the 2011 season of the reality game show Expedition Impossible.

References 

1980 births
Living people
Players of American football from San Diego
San Diego State Aztecs football players
American football defensive backs
American football wide receivers
Los Angeles Avengers players
Frankfurt Galaxy players